Pranitha may refer to

 Pranitha Vardhineni, an Indian archer
 Pranitha Subhash, an Indian actress